Arthur Unger was an American entertainment journalist who reviewed movies and television shows for the Christian Science Monitor and the American teen magazine Ingenue.

He edited and published several magazines such as Mechanix Illustrated and Datebook and became particularly famous for publishing the controversial "More popular than Jesus" interview with the Beatles.

Before being a journalist, he served as an Army cryptographer in the Pacific Theater in World War II.

His papers are stored at the State Historical Society of Missouri, which include recordings, transcripts, and notes from his interviews with celebrities, his writings, Beatles publications, and personal materials.

References

1924 births
2004 deaths
20th-century American journalists
Pre-computer cryptographers
People from Brooklyn